Elisakh Hagia (born 23 January 2008), known professionally as ELS, is an Indonesian rapper, singer, dancer and actress. She initially rose to international fame when she released the song Slide with rapper Silentó, then performed it with him in Malaysia. She is also known for the popular song What Els featuring Zay Hilfigerrr, and has been played over 31 million times on SoundCloud.

Early life and career
Hagia was born in Bogor in Indonesia, before moving to Jogjakarta to focus on performing. She started singing when she was 4 years old and initially taught herself on YouTube before taking professional singing lessons. She discovered a passion for Hip hop and is also inspired by the artists Jessie J and Bruno Mars.

In February 2017, Hagia composed a song with rapper Silentó called Slide, which within 2 weeks had 3 million streams on SoundCloud and, as of March 2018, has over 30 million streams. Through her social media, the promoter of Urban Street Jam and Silentó invited her to perform.

In March 2017, Hagia performed to represent Indonesia at the Urban Street Jam. In April 2017, she released her second song What Els on SoundCloud. She wrote the lyrics herself and hoped to inspire other children with the song. She performed it for the first time on Kompas TV. In July 2017, she performed with Silentó for the first time at Electric Run Malaysia.

In August 2017, Hagia held an audition for young dancers under 17 years old to perform with her in her second single. Four children were chosen from the audition, whom she took to her performance at the Development Basketball League (DBL) Indonesia. She performed at the 2017 KAGAMA Kangen Gathering event at Ecovention Hall, Ancol.

Discography

Singles
 What Els (feat. Zay Hilfigerrr) (2017)
Slide (feat. Silentó) (2017)

Featured Artist Singles
 Pay You back (Mir Money feat. ELS) (2018)

Filmography

Television appearances

Live performances
DBL Indonesia
Temu Kangen KAGAMA
Electric Run Malaysia (with Silentó)
Seoul on Stage

References

External links 
Official site

Living people
2008 births
Indonesian rappers
Indonesian child singers
21st-century Indonesian women singers
Indonesian female dancers